The Brisbane Philharmonic Orchestra (BPO) is a community orchestra based in Brisbane, Australia, which performs a wide variety of orchestral works.

The BPO performs several concerts each year at venues including the Brisbane City Hall, and the Old Museum Building, Brisbane. The orchestra also tours regionally throughout Queensland on occasion.

Entry to the BPO is by audition and it is the only community orchestra within the city that rotates guest conductors by invitation rather than establishing a permanent music director. The organisation is administered by an executive committee elected by the members each year. The members are involved voluntarily in all facets of the organisation such as concert production, marketing and promotion, auditions, and social events.

History 
The orchestra was formed in 1999 with only 18 musicians. In 2000, the orchestra changed its name to the Brisbane Philharmonic Orchestra. The BPO started presenting annual subscription seasons from 2001. In 2005, the orchestra received an honourable recognition at the National Orchestral Awards, the first Queensland community orchestra to have received such a mention. The orchestra presented its 20th annual subscription season in 2020.

In addition to performing in its own right, the orchestra has also appeared in many popular music festivals. In May 2021, the ensemble performed with the Synthony touring show at the Brisbane Riverstage. The orchestra has regularly participated in the Queensland Music Festival, and is a long-standing contributor to the 4MBS Festival of Classics. In April 2022, the Ensemble premiered Queensland's first performance of  Shostakovich's Symphony number 4.

Past featured artists

Conductors 
 Susan Collins
 Werner Andreas Albert
 John Curro AM MBE
 Philip Davis
 Sean O'Boyle
 Paul Dean
 Nicholas Cleobury
 Emily Cox
 Chen Yang
 Simon Hewett
 Peter Luff
 Stefanie Smith
 Leo McFadden
 Nathan Aspinall
 Sergei Korschmin
 David Law
 Michael Keen
 Steven Moore
 Michael Keen
 Russell Gray

Musicians 
 Brisbane Chorale
 Canticum Chamber Choir
 William Barton (didgeridoo)
 James Cuddeford (violin)
 Deborah Humble (mezzo-soprano)
 Rosario La Spina (tenor)
 Sara Macliver (soprano)
 Katie Noonan (singer-songwriter)
 Markus Stocker (cello)
 Melinda Stocker (violin)
 Karin Schaupp (guitar)
 Malcolm Stewart (horn)
 Alex Raineri (piano)
 John Coulton (trumpet)
 Jeremy Stafford (guitar)
 Oscar Wong (piano)
 Rebecca Cassidy (soprano)
 Vivienne Collier-Vickers (horn)
 Lauren Manuel (horn)
 Oliver Boyd (baritone)
 Anna Stephens (soprano)
 Annika Hinrichs (soprano)
 Jonathan Henderson (flute)
 Shaun Brown (baritone)
 Levi Hansen (piano)
 Tijana Kozarčić (harp)
 Rosa Guitar Trio (guitars)
 David Wakeham (baritone)
 Henry Choo (baritone)
 Natalie Christer Peluso (soprano)
 Brijette Tubb (flute)

Other artists 
 Tama Matheson (actor)
 Barry Otto (actor)

See also 
 Culture of Brisbane

References

External links 
Brisbane Philharmonic Orchestra (BPO) Website

Musical groups established in 1999
Australian orchestras
Culture of Brisbane
Organisations based in Brisbane
1999 establishments in Australia